Kenneth O. May Prize and Medal in history of mathematics is an award of the International Commission on the History of Mathematics (ICHM) "for the encouragement and promotion of the history of mathematics internationally". It was established in 1989 and is named in honor of Kenneth O. May, the founder of ICHM. Since then, the award is given every four years, at the ICHM congress.

Kenneth O. May Prize winners 
Source: (1989-2005)  A Brief History of the Kenneth O. May Prize
2017: Eberhard Knobloch and Roshdi Rashed
2013: Menso Folkerts and Jens Høyrup
2009: Ivor Grattan-Guinness and Radha Charan Gupta
2005: Henk J. M. Bos 
2001: Ubiratàn D'Ambrosio and Lam Lay Yong
1997: René Taton 
1993: Christoph Scriba and Hans Wussing 
1989: Dirk Struik and Adolph P. Yushkevich

See also

 List of history awards
 List of mathematics awards

References 

  A Brief History of the Kenneth O. May Prize in the History of Mathematics
  BLC Newsletter August 2009

Mathematics awards
History of science awards
Awards established in 1989